All in Good Faith is a British sitcom that aired on ITV from 1985 to 1988. Starring Richard Briers, it was written by John Kane. All in Good Faith was made for the ITV network by Thames Television.

Synopsis
Rev Lambe is vicar of All Saints Church in a typical middle England town. Each episode focusses on his role as mediator in various issues between parishioners or resolving the troubles of an individual.

Cast
Richard Briers - The Reverend Philip Lambe
Barbara Ferris - Emma Lambe (series 1 and 2)
Susan Jameson - Emma Lambe (series 3)
Lydia Smith - Miranda Lambe (series 1 and 2)
James Campbell - Peter Lambe (series 1 and 2)
James Cossins - Major Andrews (series 1)
Robert Bridges - Wilf (series 1)
Frank Middlemass - Desmond Frank (series 2 and 3)
T. P. McKenna - Oscar Randolph (series 2)
John Woodvine - Oscar Randolph (series 3)

Plot
All in Good Faith was written especially for its lead star, The Good Life actor Richard Briers.  The series was his first ITV sitcom.  He played the Reverend Philip Lambe who, in his middle age, decides to move from his wealthy Oxfordshire parish to one in Edendale, a fictional urban town in the Midlands.  He is determined to do things in his new parish and is faced with new problems like homeless people.  He is accompanied by his wife Emma, sixteen-year-old daughter Miranda and twelve-year-old son Peter.

Episodes

Series 1 (1985-6)

Series 2 (1987)

Series 3 (1988)

Special (1988)
Short special as part of ITV Telethon.

DVD release

References
Mark Lewisohn, "Radio Times Guide to TV Comedy", BBC Worldwide Ltd, 2003
All in Good Faith at British TV Comedy

External links

1985 British television series debuts
1988 British television series endings
1980s British sitcoms
ITV sitcoms
Television shows produced by Thames Television
English-language television shows